Acanthocobitis (Paracanthocobitis) urophthalma, also known as the banded mountain zipper loach, is a species of ray-finned fish in the genus, or subgenus, Paracanthocobitis. This species is endemic to southwestern Sri Lanka.

References

urophthalma
Freshwater fish of Sri Lanka
Fish described in 1868
Taxa named by Albert Günther